Androisoxazole (brand names Androxan, Neo-Ponden, Neo-Pondus), also known as 17α-methyl-5α-androstano[3,2-c]isoxazol-17β-ol, is an orally active anabolic-androgenic steroid (AAS) and a 17α-alkylated derivative of dihydrotestosterone (DHT) that is marketed in Spain and Italy. It is closely related to stanozolol, differing only in having an isoxazole instead of pyrazole ring fused to the A ring, and is also related to furazabol, prostanozol, and danazol.

References

Tertiary alcohols
Androgens and anabolic steroids
Androstanes
Hepatotoxins
Isoxazoles